Edwin Tryon Billings (1824-1893) or E.T. Billings was a portrait painter in 19th-century United States. He lived in Montgomery, Alabama; Worcester, Massachusetts; and in Boston. Among his numerous portrait subjects were Daniel Webster, William Lloyd Garrison and Oliver Wendell Holmes, Sr.

Biography
Billings was born November 20, 1824, to wheelwright Ira Billings and Eunice Tryon of Massachusetts.  He lived in Montgomery, Alabama, intermittently c. 1850-1859; and in Worcester, Massachusetts, c. 1854-1856. He "first visited Worcester in 1854. Billings painted several important Worcester residents, including John Davis and Stephen Salisbury. His work hung in many public buildings including the Worcester County Courthouse and Mechanics Hall."

He moved to Boston in the 1860s, working in the Studio Building on Tremont Street c. 1864-1891. In the 1874 exhibition of the Massachusetts Charitable Mechanic Association Billings showed several paintings, including "Child and Kitten," and "Children and Rabbits." His work also appeared in the 1887 National Academy of Design exhibit.

Billings married Frances E. Keller in 1867. Friends included painter George Fuller, with whom he travelled in the southern United States. Among Billings' possessions was a copy of Walt Whitman's Two Rivulets, annotated by Whitman, and notably auctioned for a relatively high sum in 1909.

Portrait subjects included:

 Ira Billings, father of E.T. Billings
 James Freeman Clarke
 Alpheus Crosby
 Thomas Russell Crosby
 John Davis
 George Fuller
 Helen Eliza Benson Garrison, wife of W.L. Garrison
 William Lloyd Garrison
 Oliver Wendell Holmes, Sr.
 Abraham Lincoln
 Maria Mitchell
 Andrew Preston Peabody
 Abigail Lord Rogers
 Stephen Salisbury
 Daniel Webster
 Calvin Willard

Portraits by E.T. Billings

References

Further reading
 George C Groce. New-York Historical Society's dictionary of artists in America. NY: 1957
 Mantle Fielding's Dictionary of American painters, sculptors & engravers.
 Edwin C Pancoast. Billings of Boston—Yankee portrait painter : a new look at the life, times and work of Edwin Tryon Billings (1824-1893) and his early association with photography. Chevy Chase, Md.: Pancoast, 1990.
 Obituary. Boston Daily Globe, Oct 21, 1893

External links

 Smithsonian Art Inventories Catalog. "Billings, Edwin Tryon, 1824-1893, painter"
 Preservation Worcester. Main Street Virtual Tour

1824 births
1893 deaths
Artists from Boston
19th century in Boston
American portrait painters
Cultural history of Boston
19th-century American painters
American male painters
19th-century American male artists